Faroe Islands competed at the 2019 World Aquatics Championships in Gwangju, South Korea from 12 to 28 July.

Swimming

Faroe Islands entered three swimmers.

Men

Women

References

Nations at the 2019 World Aquatics Championships
Faroe Islands at the World Aquatics Championships
2019 in Faroese sport